Fenerbahçe Ülker is the professional men's basketball department of Fenerbahçe S.K., a major multisport club based in Istanbul, Turkey.

For the season roster: 2011-12 Roster

Group A regular season

Fixtures/results
All times given below are in Central European Time.

Group G Top 16
Top 16 began in January 2012 and will conclude in March 2012.

Fixtures/results

External links
Official Fenerbahçe site 
Euro League Page 
TBLStat.net 
Euroleague Format
Euroleague.net
Fenerbahçe fansite

References

2011-12
2011–12 Euroleague by club
2011–12 in Turkish basketball by club